An oxygen tank is an oxygen storage vessel, which is either held under pressure in gas cylinders, or as liquid oxygen in a cryogenic storage tank.

Uses

Oxygen tanks are used to store gas for:

 medical breathing at medical facilities and at home
 breathing at altitude in aviation, either in a decompression emergency, or constantly (as in unpressurized aircraft)
 oxygen first aid kits
 oxygen therapy
 gas blending, for creating diving breathing mixes such as nitrox, trimix and heliox 
 open-circuit scuba sets - mainly used for accelerated decompression in technical diving
 some types of diving rebreather: oxygen rebreathers and fully closed circuit rebreathers
 use in climbing, "Bottled oxygen" refers to oxygen tanks for mountaineering
 industrial processes, including the manufacture of steel and monel
 oxyacetylene welding equipment, glass lampworking torches, and some gas cutting torches
 use as liquid rocket propellants for rocket engines 
 athletes, specifically on American football sidelines, to expedite recovery after exertion.

Breathing oxygen is delivered from the storage tank to users by use of the following methods: oxygen mask, nasal cannula, full face diving mask, diving helmet, demand valve, oxygen rebreather, built in breathing system (BIBS), oxygen tent, and hyperbaric oxygen chamber.

Contrary to popular belief scuba divers very rarely carry oxygen tanks. The vast majority of divers breathe air or nitrox stored in a diving cylinder. A small minority breathe trimix, heliox or other exotic gases. Some of these may carry pure oxygen for accelerated decompression or as a component of a rebreather. Some shallow divers, particularly naval divers, use oxygen rebreathers or have done so historically.

Medical use liquid oxygen airgas tanks are typically .

All equipment coming into contact with high pressure oxygen must be "oxygen clean" and "oxygen compatible", to reduce the risk of fire. "Oxygen clean" means the removal of any substance that could act as a source of ignition. "Oxygen compatible" means that internal components must not burn readily or degrade easily in a high pressure oxygen environment.

In some countries there are legal and insurance requirements and restrictions on the use, storage and transport of pure oxygen. Oxygen tanks are normally stored in well-ventilated locations, far from potential sources of fire and concentrations of people.

See also
 Bottled gas
 Gas cylinder
 Dewar flask

References 

Underwater breathing apparatus
Decompression equipment
Pressure vessels
Tank
Industrial gases
Gas technologies